Events from the year 1966 in Argentina.

Incumbents
 President: Arturo Umberto Illia (1 January - 28 June), Juan Carlos Onganía (29 June - 31 December)
 Vice president: Carlos Humberto Perette (1 January - 28 June), vacant

Governors
 Buenos Aires Province: 
 until 28 June: Anselmo Marini 
 28 June-5 July: Jorge Von Stecher
 from 5 July: Francisco A. Imaz
 Cordoba: Justo Páez Molina (until 28 June)
 Chubut Province: Manuel Pío Raso then Carlos Arturo Vellegal then Gerardo Ojanguren then Rodolfo Varela
 Mendoza Province: 
 until 28 June: Francisco Gabrielli 
 28 June-22 July: Tomás José Caballero
 from 22 July: José Eugenio Blanco
 Santa Fe Province: Aldo Tessio (until 28 June); Carlos Sylvestre Begnis (from 28 June)

Vice Governors
 Buenos Aires Province: vacant

Events
 29 July – La Noche de los Bastones Largos

Births
 11 August – Juan María Solare, composer and pianist
 18 August – Gustavo Charif, artist

Deaths
 26 December – Guillermo Stábile, footballer and manager (b. 1905)

See also

 1966 in Argentine football
 1966 Argentine Primera División
 List of Argentine films of 1966

References

External links

 
Years of the 20th century in Argentina